José Carlos Maltos Díaz (born August 18, 1991) is a Mexican professional gridiron football placekicker for the Ottawa Redblacks of the Canadian Football League (CFL). The Redblacks selected him second overall in the 2019 CFL–LFA Draft. He was originally signed by the New Orleans Saints of the National Football League (NFL) in 2013, but was released following training camp. He played college football for UANL.

Early life
Maltos was born in Monterrey, Mexico, on August 18, 1991. He grew up playing soccer, but began to play American football at the age of 16 in Monterrey.

College career
Maltos was a kicker for Auténticos Tigres UANL at the Autonomous University of Nuevo León, where he studied mechanical engineering. He was chosen to play in the Aztec Bowl.

Professional career

New Orleans Saints
After working out in front of NFL scouts at Southern Methodist University, Maltos was signed by the New Orleans Saints in May 2013. He was released by the team in early August.

Fundidores Monterrey
Maltos spent three seasons in the LFA with the Fundidores Monterrey from 2017 to 2019.

BC Lions
Maltos was signed as a free agent by the BC Lions on May 18, 2018. He played in two pre-season games before being released at the end of training camp.

Ottawa Redblacks
After the CFL mandated that teams carry Global players, Maltos was drafted 2nd overall in the 2019 CFL–LFA Draft and returned to Canada to play for the Ottawa Redblacks. He dressed in his first CFL game on June 15, 2019, against the Calgary Stampeders, as a backup placekicker and punter. He dressed in ten games in 2019, but did not play in 2020 due to the cancellation of the 2020 CFL season. He re-signed with the Redblacks on January 13, 2021. He spent the next two years mostly on the practice roster and was not re-signed following the 2022 season.

Montreal Alouettes
On December 9, 2022, Maltos signed with the Montreal Alouettes.

National team career
Maltos represented the Mexico national team at the 2011 IFAF World Championship held in Austria, where he kicked a 56-yard field goal in a win over Australia to break the record for longest field goal in World Championship history. He was named the best kicker of the tournament. Maltos was later a part of the team that finished in third place at the 2015 IFAF World Championship.

References

External links
Montreal Alouettes bio

1991 births
Living people
Mexican players of American football
Mexican players of Canadian football
American football placekickers
New Orleans Saints players
Canadian football placekickers
Sportspeople from Monterrey
Fundidores de Monterrey players
Mexican expatriate sportspeople in Canada
BC Lions players
Auténticos Tigres UANL players
Ottawa Redblacks players
Montreal Alouettes players